State awards of the Kyrgyz Republic include the orders, decorations, and medals in Kyrgyzstan. They consist of military and civil decorations that are bestowed by various agencies of the government.

Titles

Hero of the Kyrgyz Republic
The title of Hero of the Kyrgyz Republic is the highest state award in the country.

Honorary titles 

 People's Artist of the Kyrgyz Republic
 People's Writer of the Kyrgyz Republic
 People's Poet of the Kyrgyz Republic
 People's Artist of the Kyrgyz Republic
 Honored Artist of the Kyrgyz Republic
 Honored Doctor of the Kyrgyz Republic
 Honored Inventor of the Kyrgyz Republic
 Honored Builder of the Kyrgyz Republic
 Honored Teacher of the Kyrgyz Republic
 Honored Lawyer of the Kyrgyz Republic
 Honored Economist of the Kyrgyz Republic
 Honored Worker of Culture of the Kyrgyz Republic
 Honored Scientist of the Kyrgyz Republic
 Honored Worker of the Geological Service of the Kyrgyz Republic
 Honored Worker of the State Service of the Kyrgyz Republic
 Honored Health Worker of the Kyrgyz Republic
 Honored Worker of Local Self-Government of the Kyrgyz Republic
 Honored Worker of Education of the Kyrgyz Republic
 Honored Worker of Nature Protection of the Kyrgyz Republic
 Honored Worker of Industry of the Kyrgyz Republic
 Honored Communications Worker of the Kyrgyz Republic
 Honored Worker of Agriculture of the Kyrgyz Republic
 Honored Worker of the Service Sector of the Kyrgyz Republic
 Honored Transport Worker of the Kyrgyz Republic
 Honored Worker of Physical Culture and Sports of the Kyrgyz Republic

People's Artist of Kyrgyzstan 
The People's Artist of the Kyrgyz SSR is an honorary title established on January 10, 1939. It was established by the Presidium of the Supreme Council of the Kyrgyz SSR to outstanding artists who were particularly distinguished in the development of theater, music and cinema. As a rule, it was awarded no earlier than five years after the honorary title “Honored Artist of the Kyrgyz SSR” or “Honored Artist of the Kyrgyz SSR”. The next degree of recognition was the awarding of the title of People's Artist of the USSR. The first award ceremony took place in 1939; The first owner of this title was the actor Ashirali Botaliev. Artists of the Osh Uzbek Musical Drama Theater were one of the first in the republic to receive the title of people's artists of the Kyrgyz SSR. It was last awarded in 1986. With the collapse of the Soviet Union in Kyrgyzstan, the title "People's Artist of the Kyrgyz SSR" was replaced by the title "People's Artist of Kyrgyzstan", while the title retained the rights and obligations stipulated by the legislation of the former USSR and the Kyrgyz SSR on awards.

People's Writer of Kyrgyzstan 
The People's Writer of the Kyrgyz Republic is awarded to writers, playwrights and literary critics for their special merits in the development of domestic literature. On June 20, 1968, the title "People's Writer of the Kyrgyz SSR" was established, which after the collapse of the USSR was replaced by the title "People's Writer of the Kyrgyz Republic".

Orders and medals (in order of precedence) 

 Ak-Shumkar Medal (connected to the title of Hero of the Kyrgyz Republic)

Order of Manas
 Order of Kurmanjan Datka
 Order of Danaker
 Dank Order
 Order of Dostyk
Order of Mother Heroine
 Medal of Courage
 Dank Medal
 Medal "Mother's Glory"
Order of Chinghiz Aitmatov

Certificates of honor 
Certificates of honor can be awarded for merits in enhancing the socio-economic situation of the country, significant achievements in the civil service, and achievements in the fields of education and medicine.

Gallery

References 

Kyrgyzstani culture